Pisai is a small village in Ratnagiri district, Maharashtra state in Western India. The 2011 Census of India recorded a total of 1,125 residents in the village. Pisai is 836 hectares in size.

References

Villages in Ratnagiri district